is a Japanese volleyball player. He competed in the men's tournament at the 2008 Summer Olympics.

References

1981 births
Living people
Japanese men's volleyball players
Olympic volleyball players of Japan
Volleyball players at the 2008 Summer Olympics
Sportspeople from Nagano Prefecture